Vittorio Amedeo Ranuzzi de' Bianchi (14 July 1857 – 16 February 1927) was an Italian Cardinal of the Roman Catholic Church. He served as papal majordomo from 1914 until his death, and was elevated to the cardinalate in 1916.

Biography
Vittorio Ranuzzi de' Bianchi was born in Bologna to a family of nobility. He received the Sacrament of Confirmation in 1865, and studied at the Seminary of Bologna and the Theological College of Bologna, from where he received his doctorate in theology in July 1882. In April 1886, he earned his doctorate in canon and civil law.

Ranuzzi was ordained to the priesthood on 14 May 1880, and then did pastoral work in the archdiocese of Bologna and taught at its seminary, where he also served as spiritual director from 1894 to 1899. He was later made an honorary canon (1885) and primicerius (1892) of the cathedral chapter, counselor of the nunciature to France on 13 September 1899, and a Domestic Prelate of His Holiness in 1899.

On 22 June 1903, Ranuzzi was appointed Bishop of Recanati-Loreto by Pope Leo XIII. He received his episcopal consecration on the following 12 July from Cardinal Pietro Respighi, with Archbishops Giuseppe Constantini and Rafael Merry del Val serving as co-consecrators, at the chapel of the Nobili Oblate in Tor de' Specchi in Rome. After being promoted to Titular Archbishop of Tyrus on 27 November 1911, Ranuzzi was later named Master of the Papal Chamber on 30 November of that same year, and papal majordomo on 7 September 1914.

Pope Benedict XV created him Cardinal Priest of Santa Prisca in the consistory of 4 December 1916. Ranuzzi was one of the cardinal electors who participated in the 1922 papal conclave, which selected Pope Pius XI.

Ranuzzi died in Rome, at the age of 69. He is buried in his family's tomb at the Carthusian cemetery in Bologna.

References

External links
Cardinals of the Holy Roman Church
Catholic-Hierarchy 

1857 births
1927 deaths
20th-century Italian cardinals
20th-century Italian Roman Catholic bishops
Clergy from Bologna